Patania aedilis is a moth in the family Crambidae. It was described by Edward Meyrick in 1887. It is found in Australia, where it has been recorded from Queensland.

The hindwings have a white margin.

References

Moths described in 1887
Moths of Australia
Spilomelinae
Taxa named by Edward Meyrick